This is a complete list of songs by South Korean boy group Pentagon.

0–9

A

B

C

D

E

F

G

H

I

J

L

M

N

O

P

R

S

T

U

V

W

Y

Z

Other songs

Notes

See also
Pentagon discography 
List of songs written and produced by Jinho
List of songs written and produced by Hui
List of songs written and produced by Hongseok
List of songs written and produced by Yeo One
List of songs written and produced by Yuto
List of songs written and produced by Kino
List of songs written and produced by Wooseok

References

Pentagon